Lathicrossa prophetica is a species of moth of the family Oecophoridae.  It is endemic to New Zealand and has been found in both the North and South Islands. This species inhabits sub-alpine native forest and adults are on the wing in January. It is classified as "Data Deficient" by the Department of Conservation.

Taxonomy   
This species was described by Edward Meyrick in 1927 using a specimen collected by Selwyn Woodward at Mount Arthur in the Nelson district in January. George Hudson discussed and illustrated this species in his 1928 publication The Butterflies and Moths of New Zealand. The male holotype specimen is held at the Natural History Museum, London.

Description 

Meyrick described the species as follows:

Distribution 
This species is endemic to New Zealand. Other than the type locality, it has been collected at Karori in Wellington, Lake Rotoroa and at Karamea Bluffs on the West Coast.

Biology and behaviour 
The adults of this species is on the wing in January.

Habitat 

The holotype specimen was collected at approximately 1050m above sea-level. This species frequents sub-alpine forest.

Conservation status 
This species has been classified as having the "Data Deficient" conservation status under the New Zealand Threat Classification System.

References

Moths described in 1927
Moths of New Zealand
Oecophoridae
Taxa named by Edward Meyrick
Endemic fauna of New Zealand
Endemic moths of New Zealand